Phytoecia pseudosomereni is a species of beetle in the family Cerambycidae. It was described by Stephan von Breuning in 1964. It is known from Cameroon.

References

Endemic fauna of Cameroon
Phytoecia
Beetles described in 1964